Bernard Whittaker was an English footballer who played in The Football League for Blackburn Rovers.

1888-1889
Bernard Whittaker made his debut for Rovers at Inside-Left on 12 January 1889. The venue was Leamington Road, Blackburn then home of Blackburn Rovers, and their opponents were 'The Invincibles' the great Preston North End. Rovers got themselves a draw despite being behind twice. Whittaker achieved an assist for the 2nd equaliser. Whittaker played 3 more League matches, all at Inside-Left, and scoring the only Rovers goal at Anfield, Liverpool, then home of Everton. Whittaker assisted Rovers score 66 goals in 22 games the 2nd highest of that season.

References

English footballers
Blackburn Rovers F.C. players
English Football League players
1865 births
1957 deaths
Association football forwards
Year of death missing